Norman Podhoretz (born January 16, 1930) is an American magazine editor, writer, and conservative political commentator, who identifies his views as "paleo-neoconservative". He is a writer for Commentary magazine, and previously served as the publication's editor-in-chief from 1960 to 1995.

Early life and education
The son of Julius and Helen (Woliner) Podhoretz, Jewish immigrants from the Central European region of Galicia (then part of Poland, now Ukraine), Podhoretz was born and raised in Brownsville, Brooklyn. Podhoretz's family was leftist, with his elder sister joining a socialist youth movement. He skipped two grades and attended the prestigious Boys High School in the borough's Bedford-Stuyvesant neighborhood, ultimately graduating third in his class in 1946; his classmates included the prominent Assyriologist William W. Hallo and advertising executive Carl Spielvogel. Following his admission to Harvard University and New York University with partial tuition scholarships, Podhoretz ultimately elected to attend Columbia University when he was granted a full Pulitzer Scholarship.

In 1950, Podhoretz received his BA degree in English literature from Columbia, where he was mentored by Lionel Trilling. He concurrently earned a second bachelor's degree in Hebrew literature from the nearby Jewish Theological Seminary of America; although Podhoretz never intended to enter the rabbinate, his father (who only attended synagogue on the High Holidays) wanted to ensure that his son was nonetheless conversant in "the intellectual tradition of his people", as "a nonobservant New World Jew who ... treasured the Hebraic tradition".

After being awarded the Kellett Fellowship from Columbia and a Fulbright Scholarship, he later received a second BA in literature with first-class honors and an Oxbridge MA from Clare College, Cambridge, where he briefly pursued doctoral studies after rejecting a graduate fellowship from Harvard. He also served in the United States Army from 1953 to 1955 as a draftee assigned to the Army Security Agency.

Career
Podhoretz served as Commentary magazine's Editor-in-Chief from 1960 (when he replaced Elliot E. Cohen) until his retirement in 1995. Podhoretz remains Commentary'''s Editor-at-Large. In 1963, he wrote the essay "My Negro Problem—And Ours", in which he described the oppression he felt from African-Americans as a child, and concluded by calling for a color-blind society, and advocated "the wholesale merging of the two races [as] the most desirable alternative for everyone concerned."

From 1981 to 1987, Podhoretz was an adviser to the U.S. Information Agency. From 1995 to 2003, he was a senior fellow at the Hudson Institute. He was awarded the Presidential Medal of Freedom by George W. Bush in 2004. The award recognized Podhoretz's intellectual contributions as editor-in-chief of Commentary magazine and as a senior fellow at the Hudson Institute.

Norman Podhoretz was one of the original signatories of the "Statement of Principles" of the Project for the New American Century founded in 1997. That organization sent a letter to President Clinton in 1998 advocating the removal by force of Saddam Husein in Iraq.

Podhoretz received the Guardian of Zion Award from Bar-Ilan University on May 24, 2007.

He served as a senior foreign policy advisor to Rudy Giuliani in his 2008 presidential campaign. The same year, he publicly advocated an American attack on Iran.

Podhoretz's 2009 book Why Are Jews Liberals? questions why American Jews for decades have been dependable Democrats, often supporting the party by margins of better than two-to-one, even in years of Republican landslides.

Personal life 

Podhoretz attends a Conservative Jewish synagogue.  The congregation emphasizes group study, serious praying, active participation by its members and religious services.

Podhoretz was married to author Midge Decter from 1956 until her death in 2022, and together they had two children: syndicated columnist and current Commentary editor-in-chief John Podhoretz and American-Israeli journalist Ruthie Blum.  Norman Podhoretz said in early 2019, of his large family and its relation to his political views: "[I]f [Donald Trump] doesn't win in 2020, I would despair of the future. I have 13 grandchildren and 12 great grandchildren, and they are hostages to fortune. So I don't have the luxury of not caring what's going to happen after I'm gone." , Podhoretz lives on the Upper East Side of Manhattan.

Political views
Initially a staunch liberal, Podhoretz moved Commentary to the left editorially when he took over the magazine. However, he became increasingly critical of the New Left and gradually moved rightward as the 1960s wore on. By the 1970s, he was a leading member of the neoconservative movement.

Iraq War
In the leadup to the 2003 U.S. invasion of Iraq, Podhoretz argued strongly for military intervention, claiming that Saddam Hussein posed a direct threat to the United States.
After the 9/11 attack and more than a year before the start of the War in Iraq, Podhoretz wrote in February 2002 that
"There is no doubt that Saddam already possesses large stores of chemical and biological weapons, and may ... be 'on the precipice of nuclear power.' ... Some urge that we ... concentrate on easier targets first. Others contend that the longer we wait, the more dangerous Saddam will grow. Yet whether or not Iraq becomes the second front in the war against terrorism, one thing is certain: there can be no victory in this war if it ends with Saddam Hussein still in power."

Iranian nuclear program
In 2007, Podhoretz argued that the United States should attack Iranian nuclear facilities. According to The Sunday Times, Podhoretz believes that "Iraq, Afghanistan and Iran are merely different fronts of the same long war." Podhoretz describes diplomatic efforts with Iran as similar to appeasement of Nazi Germany prior to World War II. He also contends that the War on Terror is a war against Islamofascism, and constitutes World War IV (World War III having been the Cold War), and advocates the bombing of Iran to preempt Iranian acquisition of nuclear weapons. His book on that subject, entitled World War IV: The Long Struggle Against Islamofascism, was published by Doubleday on September 11, 2007. (published online September 6, 2007)

In a 2007 column, Podhoretz explicitly stated his view that Iran should be attacked: "In short, the plain and brutal truth is that if Iran is to be prevented from developing a nuclear arsenal, there is no alternative to the actual use of military force—any more than there was an alternative to force if Hitler was to be stopped in 1938."

Vietnam War
In an editorial to The Wall Street Journal on the sixth anniversary of the September 11 attacks, Podhoretz contends that the retreat from Iraq should not be similar to the retreat from South Vietnam. He argues that when the U.S. withdrew from Vietnam, it sacrificed its national honor.

In 1982, James Fallows wrote a review of Podhoretz's book, Why We Were in Vietnam, for The New York Times, in which he accuses Podhoretz of "changing his views" and "self-righteousness" on the subject of Vietnam, noting that in 1971 Podhoretz wrote that he would "prefer just such an American defeat to a 'Vietnamization' of the war."

The longer passage from which the 1971 quote comes is as follows:

Soviet Union
In the early 1980s, Podhoretz was extremely skeptical that fundamental reform was possible in the USSR, and sharply criticized those who argued that U.S. policy toward the Soviet Union should be one of détente. In his 1980 book The Present Danger, Podhoretz predicted that the United States was in danger of losing the Cold War and falling behind the Soviet Union as a global power. Later he would express anger with President Ronald Reagan for "not establishing sufficiently strong policies toward the Soviets."

George W. Bush administration
Podhoretz has praised Bush, calling him "a man who knows evil when he sees it and who has demonstrated an unfailingly courageous willingness to endure vilification and contumely in setting his face against it." He calls Bush the president who was "battered more mercilessly and with less justification than any other in living memory."

Sarah Palin
In a 2010 Wall Street Journal opinion piece titled "In Defense of Sarah Palin," Podhoretz wrote, "I hereby declare that I would rather be ruled by the Tea Party than by the Democratic Party, and I would rather have Sarah Palin sitting in the Oval Office than Barack Obama."

Donald Trump presidency
Podhoretz, who initially supported Marco Rubio in the 2016 Republican primaries, remarked about the primary campaign: 

Podhoretz says his views however, have caused him to lose ex-friends who were anti-Trump, saying: "Well some of them have gone so far as to make me wonder whether they've lost their minds altogether." Of Trump, he argues: "[T]he fact that Trump was elected is a kind of miracle. I now believe he's an unworthy vessel chosen by God to save us from the evil on the Left... His virtues are the virtues of the street kids of Brooklyn. You don't back away from a fight and you fight to win. That's one of the things that the Americans who love him, love him for—that he's willing to fight, not willing but eager to fight. And that's the main virtue and all the rest stem from, as Klingenstein says, his love of America. I mean, Trump loves America."

 Abortion 
In 1988 Podhoretz wrote, "I have recently found myself sliding toward the pro-life camp" because of the potential abuses of terminating less than perfect babies and using babies as a resource for harvesting organs. He went into write, "I predict that the line between legalized abortion and legitimation of infanticide is going to disappear."

 Gay-rights movement 
In Norman Podhoretz's 1996 Commentary Magazine piece How the Gay-Rights Movement Won he views homosexuality as a "self-evident" "perversion."  He suggests it is politics and not science that keeps homosexuality off the American Psychiatric Association's list of mental disorders.

Podhoretz states "my heart goes out to all [gay men]... because the life they live is not as good as the life available to men who make their beds with women." He goes on to declare "I for one will go on withholding my assent from this triumphant march [of normalizing homosexuality].

He concludes what is at stake "are the fundamental realities of life against the terrible distortions that have been introduced...by the gay-rights movement and its supporters."

Podhoretz's wife expressed a supportive perspective in her piece The Boys on the Beach which includes references to their family vacations on Fire Island, New York.

John Podhoretz, Norman's son and successor as Commentary Magazine editor, announced in 2012 that he, himself, is no longer an opponent of gay marriage. 

Immigration 
Podhoretz says that he had formerly been unthinkingly pro-immigration "because I'm the child of immigrants. And I thought it was unseemly of me to oppose what not only had saved my life, but had given me the best life I think I could possibly have had." However, his views later changed: "In 1924, immigration virtually stopped and the rationale for the new policy was to give newcomers a chance to assimilate—which may or may not have been the main reason—but it probably worked. What has changed my mind about immigration now—even legal immigration—is that our culture has weakened to the point where it's no longer attractive enough for people to want to assimilate to, and we don't insist that they do assimilate. ...  That was the culture of the prewar period. You certainly wanted your children to be Americans—real Americans."

Books

 1963: Hannah Arendt on Eichmann: A Study in the Perversity of Brilliance. New York: American Jewish Committee
 1963: My Negro Problem and Ours. New York: American Jewish Committee
 1964: Doings and Undoings: The Fifties and After in American Writing.  New York, Farrar, Straus (collection of essays)
 1966: The Commentary Reader: Two Decades of Articles and Stories.  New York, Atheneum editor (collection of essays).
 1967: Making It. New York, Random House (autobiography) 
 1967: Jewishness and the Younger Intellectuals: A Symposium Reprinted from Commentary, a Journal of Significant Thought and Opinion on Jewish Affairs and Contemporary Issues. New York: American Jewish Committee introduction)
 1979: Breaking Ranks: A Political Memoir. New York: Harper & Row,
 1980: The Present Danger: "Do We Have the Will to Reverse the Decline of American Power?". New York: Simon & Schuster, 
 1981: The New Defenders of Capitalism. Washington, D.C. : Ethics and Public Policy Center
 1982: Why We Were in Vietnam. New York : Simon & Schuster 
 1982: Congressional Policy: A Guide to American Foreign Policy and National Defense. Washington, D.C. : National Center for Legislative Research
 1983: The Present and Future Danger: Thoughts on Soviet/American Foreign Policy. Washington, D.C.: National Center for Legislative Research
 1984: State of World Jewry Address, 1983. New York : 92nd Street Y
 1986: Terrorism – Reagan's Response. Coral Gables, Florida : North-South Center, University of Miami, Working Paper, Soviet and East European Studies Program (transcript of a debate with Charles W. Maynes, Jiri Valenta)
 1986: The Bloody Crossroads: Where Literature and Politics Meet (collection of essays). New York : Simon & Schuster  
 1989: Israel: A Lamentation From the Future. Dollard-des-Ormeaux, Quebec: Dawn Publishing Company
 1999: Ex-Friends: Falling Out With Allen Ginsberg, Lionel & Diana Trilling, Lillian Hellman, Hannah Arendt, and Norman Mailer. New York, Free Press, (memoir) 
 2000: My Love Affair With America: The Cautionary Tale of a Cheerful Conservative (autobiography). New York: Free Press 
 2002: The Prophets: Who They Were, What They Are. New York: Free Press 
 2003: The Norman Podhoretz Reader: A Selection of His Writings from the 1950s through the 1990s, ed. Thomas L. Jeffers with a foreword by Paul Johnson. New York: Free Press 
 2005: The Bush Doctrine: What the President Said and What It Means. Washington, D.C.: The Heritage Foundation
 2007: World War IV: The Long Struggle Against Islamofascism. New York: Doubleday, 
 2009: Why Are Jews Liberals?. New York: Doubleday, 

See also

 Life Against DeathReferences

Further reading
 Abrams, Nathan.  Norman Podhoretz and Commentary Magazine: The Rise and Fall of the Neocons. Continuum, 2010
 Balint, Benjamin. Running Commentary: The Contentious Magazine That Transformed the Jewish Left Into the Neoconservative Right. PublicAffairs, 2010
 Bloom, Alexander. Prodigal Sons: The New York Intellectuals and Their World. Oxford University Press, 1986. 
 Jeffers, Thomas L.  Norman Podhoretz: A Biography. Cambridge University Press, 2010
 
 (Online version is titled "The book that scandalized the New York intellectuals".)
 Winchell, Mark Royden. Neoconservative Criticism: Norman Podhoretz, Kenneth S. Lynn, and Joseph Epstein. Twayne Publishers, 1991

Primary sources
 "Norman Podhoretz" (transcript of an interview conducted by Jill Levine, December 2, 1980 and Jan 8, July 22, 1981), New York: American Jewish Committee, Oral History Library

External links
 
 
 In Depth interview with Podhoretz, January 7, 2001
 Podhoretz N., "World War IV: How It Started, What It Means, and Why We Have to Win," CommentaryMagazine.com, September 2004
 Rago J., Unrepentant Neocon: Norman Podhoretz stands IV-square for the Bush Doctrine, The Wall Street Journal, August 12, 2006.
 Podhoretz N., "The Case for Bombing Iran," The Wall Street Journal'', May 30, 2007.
 
 

1930 births
20th-century American male writers
20th-century American non-fiction writers
21st-century American male writers
21st-century American non-fiction writers
Alumni of Clare College, Cambridge
American Zionists
American columnists
American Jewish Committee
American magazine editors
American people of Polish-Jewish descent
Boys High School (Brooklyn) alumni
Columbia College (New York) alumni
Former Marxists
Jewish American writers
Jewish Theological Seminary of America alumni
Living people
Military personnel from New York City
Neoconservatism
New York (state) Republicans
People from Brownsville, Brooklyn
People from the Upper East Side
Presidential Medal of Freedom recipients
Writers from Brooklyn
Writers from Manhattan